Gafsheh may refer to:
 Bala Mahalleh-ye Gafsheh
 Mian Mahalleh-ye Gafsheh
 Gafsheh-ye Lasht-e Nesha Rural District